Tax revenue in Luxembourg (officially the Grand Duchy of Luxembourg) was 38.65% of GDP in 2017, which is just above the average OECD in 2017 (34.19% of GDP).

Most important revenue sources for the government 

The most important revenue sources for the government are:
 Corporate income tax
 Local business tax
 Net wealth tax
 Personal income tax
 Value added tax

Taxes are administrated by government agencies. The Minister of Finance levies the taxes through the director of Taxation, the revenue offices, and the tax collection offices.

Corporate Income Tax (CIT) 

There are two possibilities: either the company is a resident or non-resident.

Resident companies: Luxembourg considers a company to be resident if its management headquarter is in the Grand Duchy. Luxembourg resident companies have to pay taxes on their worldwide income once foreign taxes (where the company is present and earns an income) are deducted.

Non-resident companies: Luxembourg considers a company to be non-resident if its principle place of management is located outside the country.

The only companies that are tax-free are:

 Companies with charitable purposes or which work for the general interest
 Private-wealth management companies
 Undertakings for collective investment

In addition to this, there is a solidarity surtax and a municipality business tax on income.

Solidarity surtax 

There is a 7% solidarity surtax amount that is imposed on the corporate income tax.
For instance, for companies with a taxable income that exceeds € 30,000, the aggregate corporate income tax rate is 19.26% (18% + 7% × 18%).

Municipal business tax on income 

This tax is levied by the municipality and varies within each municipality. For the companies that have their management headquartered in Luxembourg City, the municipal business tax is about 6.75%. 

For instance, for the companies that have a taxable income that exceeds € 30,000, the effective combined corporate income tax rate is 26.01% (19.26% + 6.75%).

Other taxes on business 

There are additional taxes on business than the corporate income taxes. For example, there is value added tax (VAT), implemented under the framework provided by the VAT Directive (2006/112/EC), with a general rate of 17% (with reduced rates of 14%, 8%, or 3%).

There is also the net wealth tax (IF) which depends on the assets held:

Personal Income Tax 

Resident individuals:

Luxembourg considers individuals as tax resident if they have their permanent residence (where they are physically present for an uninterrupted period of more than six months) in Luxembourg. Therefore, owning a residence in Luxembourg is not the only condition for tax residence.

People that are resident in Luxembourg are taxed on their worldwide income as though it were earned in Luxembourg. Non-resident individuals are only taxed on their Luxembourg-source income, while part-year residents are taxed at a percentage equivalent to what they would be taxed at if all of their income is earned in Luxembourg. It is possible for non-residents to elect to be treated as though their income is fully from Luxembourg if at least 90% of all income is derived from Luxembourg sources (50% for Belgian-resident individuals).

Structure of income tax 

In Luxembourg, the income tax is divided into eight categories:

 Trade and business income
 Income from agriculture and forestry
 Income from self-employment
 Income from employment
 Income from pensions and annuities
 Income from movable property
 Rental income
 Miscellaneous income

Taxpayers are classified into three main classes that depends on their personal situation:

 Class 1: Single individuals without children
 Class 1a: Individuals aged > 65
 Class 2: Married couples and for individuals having a  partnership contract (joint taxation)

Tax is calculated with a progressive rate table, ranging from 0% to 42% depending on income. A solidarity surcharge of 7% of income tax is added to income tax, which increases to 9% for tax class 1 and tax class 1a earning more than € 150,000 and for tax class 2 taxpayers earning more than € 300,000.

Example for the class 1 taxpayers:

Deductions are possible for, for example, job-related expenses, commuting allowances, insurance premiums, and loan interest.

Social Security Contributions 

In Luxembourg, social security contributions are payable by employers and employees. They are divided into five types of fund:

 Health insurance
 Old-age pension insurance
 Long-term care insurance
 Accident insurance
 Employers’ mutual insurance fund

There are different rates that are applicable depending on the type of fund and the employment status.

See an example the rates in 2018:

See also 

 Economy of Luxembourg
 Social welfare in Luxembourg
 Economy of Europe

References 
1. https://guichet.public.lu/en/citoyens/impots-taxes.html

2. https://europa.eu/youreurope/citizens/work/taxes/income-taxes-abroad/luxembourg/index_en.htm

3. https://eur-lex.europa.eu/legal-content/EN/ALL/?uri=celex%3A32006L0112

4. https://ec.europa.eu/taxation_customs/sites/taxation/files/docs/body/lu.pdf

5. https://mfin.gouvernement.lu/en.html

6. https://gouvernement.lu/en.html

7. https://data.oecd.org/tax/tax-revenue.htm

Tax
Society of Luxembourg